Caroline O'Neill (born in Blackpool, England) is an English television and theatre actress. She is best known for her role as Andrea Clayton in Coronation Street.

On stage, she appeared in the 2006 Royal Shakespeare Company revival of Arthur Miller’s The Crucible and in Peter Gill’s The York Realist.

Television
 Coronation Street (29 episodes, 1985) as Andrea Clayton
 Grange Hill (4 episodes, 1991) as Susan
 Dead Romantic (TV Film, 1992) as Housewife
 Body & Soul (4 episodes, 1993) as Leila
 Chiller: Here Comes the Mirror Man (TV Film, 1995) as Estate agent
 A Touch of Frost (1 episode, 1997) as Maggie Hoxton
 Queer as Folk (9 episodes, 1999–2000) as Janice Maloney
 Coronation Street (11 episodes, 2000) as Andrea Clayton
 Waking the Dead (2 episodes, 2001) as Linsey Carr
 Coronation Street (1 episode, 2001) as Andrea Clayton
 EastEnders (3 episodes, 2002) as Clare Butcher
 Behind Closed Doors (2003) as Nikki Goodwin
 This Little Life (2003) as Nurse Babs
 Hear the Silence (2003) as Anna Hoskins
 Family Affairs (20 episodes, 2005) as Pam Hargreaves
 Jane Hall (6 episodes, 2006) as Karen Kershaw
 The New Worst Witch (26 episodes, 2005–2007) as Miss Hardbroom
 Mum’s Gone Gay (2007) as Mum
 Lewis (1 episode, 2008) as Susan Chapman
 The Execution of Gary Glitter (2009) as Kelly Andrews
 The Inbetweeners (1 episode, 2010) as Model's Mum
 Upstairs, Downstairs (1 episode, 2010) as Mrs. Proude
 Whitechapel (2 episodes, 2012) as Trisha Ingall
 Lip Service (1 episode, 2012) as Caroline
 Inspector George Gently (1 episode, 2014) as Katherine Thomas
 Undeniable (1 episode, 2014) as Jo Haywood
 Happy Valley (1 episode, 2015) as Lynn Dewhurst
 Doc Martin  (1 episode, 2015) as Alice Bell
 Unforgotten (1 episode, 2015) as Joanna Bridges 
 Our Girl (1 episode, 2016) as Stella
 Last Tango in Halifax (2 episodes, 2016) as Janice
 Endeavour (19 episodes, 2013–2020) as Win Thursday
 The A Word (2020) as Pauline
 Doctors (2020) as Meryl Dibton

Theatre 
 The Crucible (Royal Shakespeare Theatre & Gielgud Theatre, 2006) as Ann Putnam
 Honeymoon Suite (Royal Court Theatre, 2004) as Izzy
 A Day in Dull Armour (Royal Court Theatre, 2002) as Mother
 The York Realist (The Lowry, Bristol Old Vic, Royal Court Theatre and Strand Theatre, 2001–2002) as Barbara
 Vertigo (Theatre Royal, Windsor & Yvonne Arnaud Theatre, 1998–1999)
 Stranger’s House (Royal Court Theatre, 1997) as Nelly
 One More Wasted Year (Royal Court Theatre, 1997) as Waitress
 Watch Out for Mr Stork (Finborough Theatre & Regent's Park Open Air Theatre, 1995) as Karen
 And His Name Was Jim (Grove Theatre, London, 1991) as Carol
 The Increased Difficulty of Concentration (Old Red Lion Theatre, 1989)
 Blithe Spirit (Dundee Repertory Theatre, 1988)
 Soapbox (Wythenshawe Forum Theatre, 1988)
 The Importance of Being Earnest (Theatre Royal, Plymouth and tour, 1986) as Cecily
 Strippers (Harlow Playhouse and tour, 1986) as Michelle
 A Man for All Seasons (tour, 1984) as Margaret
 Romeo and Juliet (Newark Palace Theatre and tour, 1984) as Juliet

Film 
 Urban Hymn (2015) as Fiona

References

External links 

British Film Institute (BFI) entry

British television actresses
British soap opera actresses
Living people
20th-century British actresses
21st-century British actresses
People from Blackpool
1958 births